Sata Lota Pan Sagla Khota is a 2015 Marathi-language comedy film directed by Shrabani Deodhar. The film had its theatrical release on 5 June 2015. The Movie Stars Adinath Kothare, Siddharth Chandekar, Pooja Sawant, Makarand Anaspure, Pushkar Shotri, and Mrunmayee Deshpande.
Shrabani Deodhar directed this movie after a long gap.

Plot
Jay (Adinath Kothare) is an orphan raised by and is financially supported by his Uncle Satyavan Makarand Anaspure. Satyavan lives in Dubai with his secretary (Pushkar Shotri). Satyavan sends Jay a monthly allowance to cover his expenses. Jay has friends called Veeru (Siddharth Chandekar) and Vasanti (Mrunmayee Deshpande) are buddies who are fun loving people with no worries about the future, they will do anything for money and have a good life.  Veeru’s father own a scrap business and wanted his son to start taking control of it but Veeru has personal terms. Jay has girlfriend named Isha (Pooja Sawant). Isha is very rich.  Along with Veeru and Vasanti, Jay and Isha live their lives happily and without worries until the day Jay realises his Uncle has stopped his allowance. The group creates a plan to make his uncle to support him once again and the confusion it creates forms the crux of story.

Cast

 Adinath Kothare as Jayvardhan
 Makarand Anaspure as Satyavan
 Pushkar Shrotri as Rokde 
 Mrunmayee Deshpande as Vasanti
 Siddharth Chandekar as Virendra
 Pooja Sawant as Isha 
 Nishigandha Wad
 Manini Mishra
 Nagesh Bhosale

Background
Director Shrabani Deodhar had the idea for this film before she took a break from film-making. After returning, she decided a young cast and experienced crew would be best to make family-oriented youth film. The co-producer of the film is her daughter Sai Deodhar. Filming completed and to release in June 2015.

Soundtrack 
 Saata Lota - Vishal Dadlani
 Halla Karuya - Siddharth Mahadevan, Shankar Mahadevan, Prakriti Kakkar

References

External links
 Sata Lota Pan Sagla Khota at Gomolo
 Sata Lota Pan Sagla Khota at JustMarathi

2010s Marathi-language films
Films directed by Shrabani Deodhar